Elena Germanovna Buianova (née Vodorezova, Водорезова; born 21 May 1963) is a Russian figure skating coach and retired competitive skater who represented the Soviet Union. She is the 1983 World bronze medalist and three-time European medalist.

Career 

Vodorezova was coached by Stanislav Zhuk at the Armed Forces sports society in Moscow. A gifted free-skater, she represented her country at the 1976 Winter Olympics aged just 12. She was the first skater to complete a double flip-triple toe loop combination. She was noted for a spectacularly high double Axel and fast spins. She won the bronze medal at the 1978 European Championships; it was the first time a Soviet ladies' single skater had won a medal at the event. She missed the 1979–1981 seasons completely due to severe juvenile arthritis, which prevented her from even walking for months in 1979.

She won a second bronze medal at the 1982 Europeans and silver at the 1983 event. She also won bronze at the 1983 World Championships – the first World medal for a Soviet female single skater. Vodorezova placed 8th at the 1984 Winter Olympics. She retired from competition in 1984. That year, she married a former skater, Sergey Buianov, and in 1987 gave birth to a son, Ivan.

She began coaching at the CSKK Club in Moscow. Irina Tagaeva often choreographs for her students. Her former pupils include:
Adelina Sotnikova
Maxim Kovtun
Elene Gedevanishvili
Olga Markova
Andrei Griazev 
Artem Borodulin 
Artur Dmitriev Jr
Denis Ten
Alexander Samarin
Adian Pitkeev
Alexandra Proklova
Maria Sotskova
Anastasiia Gubanova
Polina Tsurskaya
Elena Radionova
Egor Rukhin
Brendan Kerry

Buianova's current students include:

Artur Danielian
Alena Kostornaia

Competitive highlights

References 

1963 births
Living people
Figure skaters at the 1976 Winter Olympics
Figure skaters at the 1984 Winter Olympics
Soviet female single skaters
Olympic figure skaters of the Soviet Union
Russian figure skating coaches
Figure skaters from Moscow
World Figure Skating Championships medalists
European Figure Skating Championships medalists
Female sports coaches
Recipients of the Order "For Merit to the Fatherland", 4th class